The 1945 Temple Owls football team was an American football team that represented Temple University as an independent during the 1945 college football season. In its sixth season under head coach Ray Morrison, the team compiled a 7–1 record and outscored opponents by a total of 198 to 51. The team played its home games at Temple Stadium in Philadelphia.

Schedule

References

Temple
Temple Owls football seasons
Temple Owls football